Domenico Germinale (born 3 June 1987) is an Italian footballer who plays as a forward.

Career

Internazionale and loans
Born in Treviso, Germinale started his career at Silea Calcio, located at Silea, the Province of Treviso. He then played for Treviso F.B.C. 1993 before joined Internazionale, which he supported at young age. He played the pre-season TIM Trophy in 2004 and a 6 more friendly appearances in 2005 Germinale finally made his official debut on 14 May 2006, the last match of the Serie A season, which he substituted Pierre Womé in the 58 minutes. The match ended in 2–2 draw with Cagliari.

In summer 2006, he was loaned to Pizzighettone. After an unsuccessful half-season, he was loaned to Torres. In 2007–08 season, he was loaned to Serie C1 side Cittadella, re-joining Riccardo Meggiorini.

Foggia
In July 2008, he signed a 1+2-year contract with Foggia on free transfer. At Foggia, he finally scored regularly at Lega Pro Prima Divisione Group B.

Benevento
On 31 August 2009, Germinale transferred to Benevento of Prima Divisione Group A, signed a reported 3-year contract. Germinale seldom included in the starting XI, and on 31 January 2011 left for Como along with Walter Zullo. In the half season Germinale made 13 starts and 5 goals.

On 31 August 2011 Germinale was sold to Serie B struggler AlbinoLeffe in temporary deal with option to purchase half of the registration rights (which Germinale now had a contract with Benevento to 30 June 2014 at that time), replacing the left of former Inter team-mate Matteo Momentè. Benevento also acquired Michael Cia in the same formula. Germinale took no.7 shirt previously owned by Cia.

Germinale returned to Benevento for 2012–13 Lega Pro Prima Divisione season, which he scored 5 times. On 21 May 2013 he was released.

Serie C
On 19 July 2013 he was signed by Catanzaro in 1+1 year contract. He scored 4 times in 2013–14 Lega Pro Prima Divisione. He also scored once against former club Benevento in promotion playoffs, losing 1–2.

On 30 June 2014 he was signed by SPAL. On 26 January 2015 he was swapped with defender Andrea Pappaianni of Alessandria in a 5-month contract.

On 31 August 2015 he was hired by Bassano Virtus; playing only a few games because of a knee injury. At the end of the season it is not confirmed, and accords with the Padova. On 31 January 2017 is made official his move, outright, to Fano.

On 2 September 2019, he signed with Cavese.

On 1 February 2021, he joined Vis Pesaro on a 1.5-year contract. On 24 July 2021, the contract was terminated by mutual consent.

On 3 September 2021 he moved to Rimini in Serie D.

International career
Germinale never played for Italy youths team officially but received an Azzurri U18 call-up against Juniores League Best XI along with team-mate Matteo Momentè and Giacomo Bindi in 2006. The unofficial match Azzurrini won Juniores Best XI 3–1, the two Inter strikers scored 1 goal each.

Honors and awards
 Primavera Cup: 2006

References

External links
 archivio.inter.it
 Profile at AIC.Football.it 

1987 births
Living people
Sportspeople from Treviso
Footballers from Veneto
Italian footballers
Association football forwards
Serie A players
Serie B players
Serie C players
Serie D players
Treviso F.B.C. 1993 players
Inter Milan players
A.S. Pizzighettone players
S.E.F. Torres 1903 players
A.S. Cittadella players
Calcio Foggia 1920 players
Benevento Calcio players
Como 1907 players
U.C. AlbinoLeffe players
U.S. Catanzaro 1929 players
S.P.A.L. players
U.S. Alessandria Calcio 1912 players
Bassano Virtus 55 S.T. players
Calcio Padova players
Alma Juventus Fano 1906 players
Pordenone Calcio players
Cavese 1919 players
Vis Pesaro dal 1898 players
Rimini F.C. 1912 players